Léopold Gernaey (25 February 1927 – 31 July 2005) was a Belgian international footballer who played as a goalkeeper.

Career
Born in Gistel, Gernaey played club football for AS Oostende.

He earned a total of 17 caps for Belgium between 1953 and 1957, and participated at the 1954 FIFA World Cup.

References

1927 births
2005 deaths
Belgian footballers
Belgium international footballers
1954 FIFA World Cup players
Association football goalkeepers